Kuwait Airways flies to 54 international destinations in 31 countries across Africa, Asia, Europe and North America from its hub at Kuwait International Airport as of June 2022.

List of destinations

References

Lists of airline destinations